Khvajeh Ali Safavi (died 1427) was a son of Sadr al-Dīn Mūsā and grandson of Safi-ad-din Ardabili. He assumed leadership of the Safavid order after his father's death. According to Rudi Matthee / Encyclopedia Iranica, under Khvajeh Ali, the convictions of the Safavid order apparently shifted towards Shia Islam "under the influence of their main supporters—Turkmen tribes who adhered to a popular brand of Shiʿism". Originally (i.e. prior to Khvajeh Ali), the order seemingly bore "Sunni convictions".

References

Sources
 
 
 

1427 deaths
Safavid dynasty
Safaviyeh order
Kurdish Sufis
Iranian Kurdish people
15th-century Kurdish people